Piz d'Arpiglias is a mountain of the Sesvenna Range of the Alps, located east of Susch in the canton of Graubünden. Its eastern side is part of the Swiss National Park (Macun Seeplatte).

References

External links
 Piz d'Arpiglias on Hikr

Mountains of Graubünden
Mountains of the Alps
Alpine three-thousanders
Mountains of Switzerland
Zernez